M. B. "Bud" Seretean (born Martin Bud Seretean May 13, 1924 in New York City – August 13, 2007 London, England) was an American businessman and author.

Biography
He founded Coronet Industries, a subsidiary of the RCA Corporation, and served as its president and chairman of the board.  He was also a member of the board of directors of RCA. In 1965 he was named the Outstanding Small Businessman in the nation, and in 1971 was the recipient of the Gold Torch Award from the City of Hope, a pilot medical center headquartered in Duarte, California. Born in New York City, Seretean attended Oklahoma State University and afterwards attended graduate school at New York University. He gave generously to Oklahoma State University and was the primary sponsor of OSU's Center for the Performing Arts, which bears his name. He also donated generously to Emory University, where a wellness center bears his name. He was also the author of the book Living Healthy to 100. Seretean was also the former president and general manager of the Atlanta Hawks NBA team.

Seretean died August 13, 2007, of a brain hemorrhage at age 83.

References

External links
Oklahoma State University Obituary

1924 births
2007 deaths
Businesspeople from New York City
American manufacturing businesspeople
National Basketball Association executives
Atlanta Hawks executives
Oklahoma State University alumni
20th-century American businesspeople
New York University alumni